The 2007 NAIA Football Championship Series concluded on December 15, 2007 with the championship game played at Jim Carroll Stadium in Savannah, Tennessee.  The championship was won by the Carroll Fighting Saints over the Sioux Falls Cougars by a score of 17–9.

Tournament bracket

  * denotes OT.

References

NAIA Football National Championship
Sioux Falls Cougars football games
Carroll Fighting Saints football
December 2007 sports events in the United States
NAIA football